Swanley railway station is on the Chatham Main Line in England, serving the town of Swanley, Kent.

The station and most trains that call are operated by Southeastern. The station has four platforms.

Since March 2016, Oyster cards have been accepted at Swanley, with the station being placed into London's fare zone 8.

History
It was first named Sevenoaks Junction and 1871 was changed to Swanley Junction. On 27 June 1937, there was a collision between two trains near the station, resulting in the deaths of four people and with 37 injured. In 1939 a new station called Swanley was constructed approximately  further west and the original station was closed. The present station was rebuilt in 1959 when the line was widened to four tracks.

In May 2021, a new ticket office and station building was opened.

Location
The station is located at Station Approach, half a mile from Swanley Town Centre.

Facilities
The station has a staffed ticket office. The station has a self-service ticket machine and is also fitted with Oyster Card readers. The station has passenger help points on its platforms and covered seating is available on all 4 platforms which are all fitted with passenger information screens. There are toilets located on platforms 1 and 2 as well as a passenger shop and buffet. The station has a chargeable car park (106 spaces) and a cycle rack at the station entrance. Step free access is available to all platforms from the Station Approach entrance.

Services

The typical off-peak service in trains per hour is:

 1 tph to London Charing Cross (non-stop to )
 2 tph to London Blackfriars via 
 1 tph to Gillingham
 2 tph to 

During the peak hours, additional services run between London Victoria, Ashford International and Gillingham. In addition, the service to London Blackfriars is extended to and from  via .

On Sundays, the services between London Charing Cross and Maidstone East do not run.

Connections
The station is served on Mondays to Saturdays by Go-Coach route 429 to Dartford via Joydens Wood & to West Kingsdown via Farmingham and Arriva Kent Thameside route 477 to Dartford via Hextable and Wilmington & to Orpington via Crockenhill and St Mary Cray.

References

External links

Buildings and structures in Sevenoaks District
Railway stations in Kent
DfT Category C2 stations
Former Southern Railway (UK) stations
Railway stations in Great Britain opened in 1939
Railway stations served by Southeastern
Railway stations served by Govia Thameslink Railway
Swanley